is a former Japanese football player.

Playing career
Ishikawa was born in Chiba Prefecture on February 12, 1970. After graduating from Kokushikan University, he joined his local club Kashiwa Reysol in 1993. He played many positions: center back, side back, and defensive midfielder. In 1994, he played as a regular player and the club won second place and was promoted to the J1 League in 1995. Although he lost his regular position to newcomer Takeshi Watanabe in 1995, he played often in many positions. He retired at the end of the 1998 season.

Club statistics

References

External links

blog.reysol.co.jp

1970 births
Living people
Kokushikan University alumni
Association football people from Chiba Prefecture
Japanese footballers
J1 League players
Japan Football League (1992–1998) players
Kashiwa Reysol players
Association football defenders